Flamand may refer to:
 The French term for Flemish
 Flemish Movement (French: Mouvement Flamand), the political movement for emancipation and greater autonomy of the Belgian region of Flanders

Toponymy 
 Flamand River, a river in Quebec, Canada
 Little Flamand River, river in Quebec, Canada

People with the surname 
 Antonio Flamand (born 1933), Québécois politician, in Canada
 Didier Flamand (born 1947), actor, writer and French director
 Firmin Flamand, Belgian archer 
 Frédéric Flamand (born 1946), director and Belgian choreographer 
 Paul Flamand (1909–1998), French publisher and owner of Éditions du Seuil
 Thierry Flamand (born 1953), French illustrator and designer for theater and film, nominated in 2007 for César Award for Best Production Design

See also 
 Flamant (disambiguation)
Ethnonymic surnames